The names of characters based on historical figures are listed family name first. The names of other characters and all staff and cast members are written in standard English order.

 was a mobile social networking game created by Konami, which was launched for the Mobage service in December 2010. The series features female representations of feudal lords from the Sengoku period. An anime television series adaptation produced by Brain's Base aired on TV Tokyo between April 5, 2012 and September 27, 2012.

Plot
Game
The story is set in the tumultuous Sengoku Era of historical Japan, when military masters circle the figurative throne of Japan's first shogunate. In the game, "God of War Cards" have been sealed in six hidden treasures, and fighting breaks out among those who seek the treasures. As a new military master, the player embarks on a journey to obtain the treasures by clearing quests and fighting bosses.

Anime
In a different timeline, female versions of generals from the Sengoku period vie for power. One day, a mysterious light sends Oda Nobunaga and several other generals to the modern day world. As each of the generals adapts to this new lifestyle, Nobunaga goes on a quest to seek out the other generals and retrieve their secret treasures in order to return home.

Characters

Generals

The feudal lord who is mysteriously transported to the Modern World. Wanting to return to the Sengoku World, she goes on a quest to retrieve the secret treasures hidden inside the other feudal lords so that she can return home.

Nobunaga's servant who was often faithful to her. When she believed Nobunaga to be favouring Hideyoshi over her, she was consumed by jealousy and attempted to assassinate Nobunaga, causing the phenomenon that sent everyone to the Modern World. She had lost her memory upon arriving, but regained it after recovering from a coma.

A peace-loving feudal lord who enjoys singing and dancing. After coming to admire an idol, she becomes an idol herself.

Kenshin's retainer who is in love with her, wanting to fulfil her dream of conquering the land. She has wings which let her view the battlefield. When she is transported to the Modern World, she goes colorblind but regains her ability to see color when she realises how much Kenshin wants her by her side.

A feudal lord who is always beside Kanetsugu. Whilst constantly battling in the Sengoku World, Kenshin came to love the peaceful modern world and became a model.

A feudal lord who was often dependent on her servant, Kojūrō Katakura. Upon arriving in the Modern World, she was tricked by the Yakuza and arrested, but managed to escape and get revenge, and now seeks out Kojuro.

A small and cheeky but powerful general who runs a kendo dojo.

A self-proclaimed genius who enjoys inventing things, hoping to make a time machine to take her to the future.

A carefree girl who loves to eat rice.

A girl who aspires to become a general.

A con artist who carries a large scythe.

A maiden with a strong sense of justice. By day, she appears to be an absent-minded store clerk. However, on Saturday nights, she rides her motorbike and punishes delinquents under the guise of 'Saturday Night Rider'.

An assassin who has never missed a target.

She has attended a boarding school for girls in the Modern World, and lives a high school girl's life for her age.

A sub dormitory leader of Shinsenryō. She has a habit of overusing a celebrated sword .

A follower of Kondō and Hijikata lives in Shinsenryō. She looks fragile, but is really scary in reality.

Date Masamune's young aunt, even she hates being call that, and is afraid of ghosts. She shares the same name as Ashikaga Yoshiteru's daughter, Yoshiaki (which she pointed out).

A shogun of the Warring State and a representative of the Samurai. She has a grudge against Yagyū Sekishūsai for playing pranks on her, but in reality she really likes and admires her. She is a student of Bokuden.

An heir of a new kind of swordsmanship and was one of Bokuken's student. She constantly play pranks on Ashikaga, but reveal that she did it to get her attention and that she admire her.

A maid-for-hire who is inflicted with a curse which causes her to turn into a pig after sunset. The only character that comes from the Three Kingdoms Period instead of the Sengoku Period.

A quiet girl wrapped in bandages who often experiences a lot of bad luck.

A famous for the Cavalry Queen in the Sengoku World who is transported to "Nakhodka" the space station of a certain country. She can wield powerful elemental attacks but is apparently bad at maths.

Masamune's faithful servant, but she joins police and chases Masamune.

A kindergarten child who has ambition to build a big castle on a sandbox.

A famous warrior maiden and Oda Nobunaga's rival that lost to her, which led to her declining reputation.

Shrine Maidens

Other characters

Nobunaga's servant.

A challenger to Bokuden for a title of the strongest.

A master of tea.

Yoshimoto's servant.

Yoshimoto's servant.

A boy who Nobunaga encounters upon arriving in the modern world. He helps Nobunaga out before she begins her search for the hidden treasures.

The top star of singing and dancing in the modern world.

Ieyasu's manager.

An owner of the agency that Ieyasu belongs.

A mafia boss who employed Masamune.

A documentary producer.

A boy who takes care of Gennai. Gennai calls him "Assistant".

Marie's daughter.

A dancer of shemale who teaches dance in the cafe.

An artist of the cafe's regular customer.

An elementary school girl who lives with Hideyoshi.

The people in the wonderland who has the shape of a grain of rice.

A talking scarecrow in the wonderland.

An ordinary high school girl who lives with Sōun.

A female teacher.

An ambassador's daughter who relies on Hisahide to ruin the casino.

A serious woman who works with Keiji in a convenience store.

A homeless girl who came up to Tokyo from the country. Zenjubō's first friend in the modern world.

Yoshiaki's classmate.

Yoshiaki's classmate.

Yoshiaki's classmate.

An elderly former actress who employs Liu Bei to a maid.

Yoshitsugu's pen friend.

The chief investigator of the murder case who is Akechi's acquaintance.

An old-type support droid which is a shape of an electric water boiler, and has a face doodling and a message on his top. He can move independently by wheels or jets, and work by a manipulator inside him.

A perfect AI which rises in revolt against humans.

A police detective who arrested Masamune. After that, he joins the Sengoku Busho Countermaersure Department and chase Masamune who became a prison breaker, with Kojūrō.

A kindergarten child who is polite and honest. Tsunehisa finds out his talent for assisting the king, and he place himself under her order.

A kindergarten child who is a leader of Matsuda-kun group.

A kindergarten child who is a leader of Enya-kun group.

A kindergarten child who is a leader of Misawa-chan group.

Ieyasu's new manager who is an able woman but so severe.

A fan of Ieyasu who takes peeping videos her. He was given an accusation video from a lady, and runs away with Ieyasu from the chasers who aim for the camera.

An outstanding actor who co-stars with Ieyasu in a drama.

A lady wearing a red dress who collided with Kaoru. She recorded a video that accuses Tatsuya Sugimura but was killed by a syndicate.

A girl that just arrived to the modern world of Japan.

Media

Game
The Sengoku Collection social game launched for mobile devices via Yahoo!'s Mobage service in December 2010. The game is a card battle game in which players can collect up to 600 trading cards in order to become a Shogun general. The game has had over 2.5 million registered users.

Anime

An anime adaptation by Brain's Base aired in Japan on TV Tokyo between April 5, 2012 and September 27, 2012 and was also simulcast on Crunchyroll. Insert songs used in episode 2 are "Love Scope" by Kana Hanazawa and "Misty Moon" by Yuka Terasaki. Right Stuf Inc. has licensed the series for DVD and digital release in North America in 2014 under its Lucky Penny label.

References

External links
  
 Official anime website at TV Tokyo 
 

2010 video games
2012 anime television series debuts
Android (operating system) games
Anime television series based on video games
Brain's Base
IOS games
Konami games
Mobile games
Sengoku period in fiction
TV Tokyo original programming
Video games developed in Japan